Reichsbahn Königsberg was a German association football club from the city of Königsberg, East Prussia.

History
The team was established in 1927 as the railway workers' club Reichsbahn Turn- und Sportverein Königsberg. In 1939, TSV became Reichsbahn SG Königsberg and the following year was promoted to the top flight Gauliga Ostpreußen. They played there until the end of World War II and the collapse of the Gauligen with their best result being a third-place finish behind city rivals VfB Königsberg and SV Prussia-Samland Königsberg.

The Königsberg club disappeared in 1945 following war when the city was annexed by the Soviet Union and renamed Kaliningrad.

References
 Der Fußball in Ostpreußen und Danzig (en: Football in East Prussia and Danzig)
Das deutsche Fußball-Archiv historical German domestic league tables

Football clubs in Germany
Defunct football clubs in Germany
Association football clubs established in 1927
Association football clubs disestablished in 1945
Defunct football clubs in former German territories
Sport in Königsberg